The Revolutionary Marxist Group (RMG) was a Trotskyist political organization in Canada in the 1970s. Though not a registered political party it did field small numbers of candidates in several elections.

The RMG was a sympathizing section of the United Secretariat of the Fourth International, and supported the international faction led by Ernest Mandel and Tariq Ali against the faction led by the Socialist Workers Party (US) led by Joseph Hansen and Farrell Dobbs. Its main rival, the League for Socialist Action, supported the American-led faction in the international conflict within the USFI. Where the LSA was close to the SWP, the RMG was close to Britain's International Marxist Group.

The RMG was linked with an autonomous group in Quebec with similar views, the Groupe Marxiste Révolutionnaire. In 1977, the RMG, LSA and GMR fused to form the Revolutionary Workers League/Ligue Ouvrière Révolutionnaire.

Prominent members of the RMG included Steve Penner, Judy Rebick, Joe Flexer, Gary Kinsman, Bret Smiley and Barry Weisleder.

External links
Formation of the RMG documents from the Socialist History website.
1977 RMG Press Release announcing its candidate's support of gay rights in the 1977 Ontario provincial election

Political parties established in 1973
Trotskyist organizations in Canada